Wang Yihan (born 18 January 1988) is a retired Chinese professional badminton player and former women's singles world champion and Olympic silver medalist. Wang started her career with her coach Wang Pengren at only nine years of age. She was selected for the junior team in 2004, and after being promoted to the senior team in 2006 she began to shine in major tournaments. By October 2009 she was the top ranked Women's singles player in the world.

Career

2004–2006 
Wang was the bronze medallist at the 2004 Asian Junior Championships. She was also a quarterfinalist in the same year's World Junior Championships where she lost to Korean Ha Jung-eun. In 2005, she won the silver medal in Asian Junior Championships where she lost to her teammate Wang Lin in final. In 2006, she won both Asian Junior Championships & World Junior Championships with her win against Malaysian Lyddia Cheah & Indian Saina Nehwal respectively. She earned a spotlight in World's elite badminton when she won the 2006 Badminton World Cup which included her win against reigning Olympic champion Zhang Ning in semifinal and 2–times reigning world champion Xie Xingfang in final, both wins in just 2 games.

2007–2008 
In 2007, she won 3 titles, In the 2007 Summer Universiade, she beat Taipei's Cheng Shao-chieh to win the gold medal. She also won the Bitburger Open & Russian Open Grand Prix Gold that year. In 2008 she started year with finishing runner-up at the German Open losing to Jun Jae-youn. Then won her first superseries title, the Japan Open by beating leading player from Hongkong Zhou Mi with 21–19, 17–21, 21–15 scores. However, she didn't qualify for participation in 2008 Olympics, as her highest achieving teammates and senior players Xie Xingfang, Zhang Ning & Lu Lan had already confirmed their places from China.

2009 
Yihan was at her prime in this year, she won the Yonex German Open competition against fellow countrywoman Zhu Lin, and just one week later, at the age of 21, the prestigious All-England Championships against Denmark's Tine Rasmussen. Wang then went on to win the Wilson Swiss Open against compatriot Jiang Yanjiao. Yihan was the bronze medallist at the Asian Championships where she gone down fighting against Olympic silver medallist Xie Xingfang in semifinal. 
Having already won against both the Olympic champion and runner-up (Zhang Ning & Xie Xingfang) in past tournaments, she also defeated the Olympic bronze medallist Indonesia's Maria Kristin Yulianti in the group stage of 2009 Sudirman Cup with a thumping performance 16–21, 21–5, 21–10. Wang, seeded 4th at the World Championships, was upset by 11th seed Germany's Juliane Schenk in 2nd round in straight games. Wang won the Macau Open time in August 2009 when she again beat Jiang Yanjiao. In September 2009, Wang defended her YONEX Japan Open title by crushing Wang Xin (21–8, 21–9) in just 29 minutes. She lost the only final of 2009 against Tine Rasmussen in Denmark Super Series in a hard-fought match. Although she lost the final, she reached to the top position in the Women's singles rankings, when rankings were updated next week. Wang then won the 2009 French Super Series in November when she emphatically beat top seed, and defending champion, Wang Lin (21–9, 21–12). Wang won her second title in a row, and her fifth BWF Super Series tournament of the year, when she beat Jiang Yanjiao again, this time in the Yonex Sunrise Hong Kong Open. This was also her seventh title overall in 2009.

2010 

Yihan was looking to defend her All England Open title but was beaten by Tine Rasmussen in a repeat final of last year clash, in a very close match or 3 games. Just like the last year, Yihan again lost early in the BWF World Championships, losing to Japanese Eriko Hirose in 2nd round. She won her first title of the year by beating Liu Xin in the final of 2010 Denmark Super Series. Then won 2nd consecutive title by winning the 2010 French Super Series event with her win against another compatriot, Li Xuerui. In the 2010 BWF Super Series Finals, Yihan was seeded 2nd. She won all her group stage encounters, with win against Petya Nedelcheva, Tine Baun & Yip Pui Yin. But, in the semifinal, she got a shock defeat against Korean player Bae Yeon-ju, in 3 well contested games stretching over an hour.

2011 
In 2011, she reached the final of 2011 Malaysia Super Series but lost to Wang Shixian. Next week in Korean Open final, she turned the tables and defeated Shixian.  She won the gold medal in the 2011 Badminton Asia Championships by winning against Lu Lan. She made a superb comeback against Saina Nehwal in the final of 2011 Indonesia Super Series Premier when she edged through a close 2nd game to win it 12–21, 23–21, 21–14. Continuing her best form, she defeated Gu Juan, Ratchanok Intanon, Pi Hongyan & Wang Xin to reach the final of BWF World Championships. She won the gold medal, beating Cheng Shao-chieh with a big win & continued Chinese supremacy in Women's singles category. To be noted, Chinese women singles players had swept all the titles since 2000. She then won the Japan open title for 3rd consecutive time, with win over Juliane Schenk. She lost to her teammate Wang Xin for the first time, in the final of 2011 Denmark Super Series Premier hence failed to defend her title. In the final of 2011 China Open, her opponent was Wang Xin again, but Xin retired when Yihan was 18–12 up in 1st game, thus Yihan won the title. With a successful year yet again, she was looking for her first Year end title. In the 2011 BWF Super Series Finals, she lost to Sung Ji-hyun but won other 2 matches against Juliane Schenk & Tine Baun hence qualified for semifinal. She again won over Wang Xin, and set her match against India's Saina Nehwal. She won 18–21, 21–13, 21–13 and won the title.

2012 
She won Malaysia Super Series title with a comprehensive win over Wang Xin. In her 3rd All England Open final, she lost to new beaming Chinese star Li Xuerui in just 2 games. She failed to defend her Asian title with a defeat from the hands of Li Xuerui in final, thus settled for silver medal. Going into the 2012 London Olympics as a top seed, she was overwhelming favorite to win the title. In the 2nd round, she beat Bae Yeon-ju in 3 games, Cheng Shao-chieh (2–0) in quarter-finals & Saina Nehwal in semifinals also in 2 games. Her opposition in the final was from Li Xuerui again. Li took opening game 21–15 but Wang's hardwork stretched the match to the 3rd game by winning 23–21 in second. Li again proved fatal for her and won the 3rd game 21–17, and won the Olympic title, leaving Wang in despair. Hence she had to settle for yet another silver medal. Wang Yihan won the 2012 China Masters Super Series by beating a familiar rival Jiang Yanjiao. Her losing streak against Li Xuerui continued, this moment in the final of 2012 Hong Kong Super Series where Wang retired in the mid of 2nd game while trailing 12–21, 3–11. Being injured, she didn't contested the master finals of the year end, where she was the champion last year.

2013 
In 2013, she regained German Open title with winning against Juliane Schenk. She became Asian champion for the 2nd time, by mastering Li Xuerui, hence overcame her after 5 consecutive losses last year. She again defeated Li Xuerui, this time in the final of 2013 Singapore Super Series. She was the defending champion of World Championships, but lost in 2nd round itself to young Indian teenager, P. V. Sindhu. She won the 2013 Denmark Super Series Premier in a very difficult encounter of 3 games, standing victorious over Sung Ji-hyun. Successively, she won another title at the Hong Kong Open by beating Wang Shixian. She did qualified for the year and finals as no. 8 but was behind her compatriots Wang Shixian and Li Xuerui in qualifying rankings. Rule says maximum 2 players are only allowed from one nation. So she was exempted from taking part in the competition.

2014 
She again won series of titles, first was 
2014 Korea Open Super Series, then 2014 Swiss Open Grand Prix Gold & defended her Singapore title. After her Triumph in World Championships back in 2011, she was never able to get another medal in this prestigious tournament, and this further continued when she surrendered against eventual winner Carolina Marín of Spain, in 2nd round. She then stamped her class by winning gold in the 2014 Asian Games with a victory over her nemesis Li Xuerui 11–21, 21–17, 21–7. She was beaten in the Denmark Open final by Li Xuerui. She retired hurt when competing in 2nd group match of 2014 BWF Super Series Finals & was ousted from the tournament.

2015 
In 2015, she won bronze medal in the 2015 Badminton Asia Championships. Her title victory at the 2015 Chinese Taipei Open Grand Prix Gold stunned everybody, as she recorded a very disastrous win over Li Xuerui in just 29 minutes of play, conceding less than 20 points in the match. This victory showed she is still in race to contest the next year's Olympics as her recent past performances were not satisfactory. She finished quarterfinalist in the World Championships after a gruelling contest with Saina Nehwal. She then lost in Korean open final, as Sung Ji-hyun registered an upsetting victory over Wang Yihan. Coming into the Dubai world Superseries Finals, she trailblazed her way to the finals, in which she earlier defeated Ratchanok Intanon in semifinal which brought her h2h against Intanon reading 12–0. In the final though, she appeared out of sorts against Nozomi Okuhara in the decisive moments of the match, as her tireless opponent's long rallying style drained out Wang's physical strength and she lost in 2 tight games.

2016 
2016 saw Wang Yihan returning to the top 3 in the World rankings, with her consistent display in the tournaments. She was the runner up in the 2016 Swiss Open Grand Prix Gold event, losing to young Chinese He Bingjiao in the final. She won the Asian Championship title for the 3rd time, beating out Li Xuerui. She had defeated Li in 2013 also. She then sailed through to the finals of 2016 Indonesia Super Series Premier, which included her 2nd consecutive victory over 2-time reigning World Champion Carolina Marín in semifinal. However she lost to Tai Tzu-ying in final showdown. With her impressive display, Chinese coaches selected her as a 2nd candidate from China to contest the upcoming Olympic games. Hence, in the final moment, her teammate Shixian was ruled out and she was sent to Rio with already qualified Li Xuerui (defending Olympic champion). Her campaign ended in disappointment, as, even though she was a 2nd seed, she lost to surprise quarterfinalist P. V. Sindhu, the 9th seed with 2 tough games. Wang Yihan then announced her retirement from professional badminton. Wang had a very illustrious career, she has won thirty singles titles, including four Super Series Premier titles, fifteen Super Series titles, and one Super Series Finals title.

Background 
Wang is an only child. Wang credited her Mother for her badminton journey. Wang's mother used to play badminton with her just outside their home, seeing her as an energetic child, Wang's parents decided to send her to a badminton academy which eventually led to Wang's successful career. Prior to badminton, she was also recommended by her teachers to play volleyball due to her height. Wang is a native Shanghainese and speaks fluent Shanghainese.

Personal life 
When asked about her relationship status, Wang stated that she is single and is currently focusing on her career. Wang is good friends with teammates such as Li Xuerui, Tian Qing, Fu Haifeng, Lin Dan and so on.

On 26 October 2019, Wang announced her marriage to Gu Zhengyun, a former member of the Shanghai badminton team.

Achievements

Olympic Games 
Women's singles

World Championships
Women's singles

World Cup 
Women's singles

Asian Games 
Women's singles

Asian Championships 
Women's singles

Summer Universiade
Women's singles

World Junior Championships 
Girls' singles

Asian Junior Championships 
Girls' singles

BWF Superseries 
The BWF Superseries, which was launched on 14 December 2006 and implemented in 2007, is a series of elite badminton tournaments, sanctioned by the Badminton World Federation (BWF). BWF Superseries levels are Superseries and Superseries Premier. A season of Superseries consists of twelve tournaments around the world that have been introduced since 2011. Successful players are invited to the Superseries Finals, which are held at the end of each year. 

  BWF Superseries Finals tournament
  BWF Superseries Premier tournament
  BWF Superseries tournament

BWF Grand Prix 
The BWF Grand Prix has two levels, the BWF Grand Prix and Grand Prix Gold. It is a series of badminton tournaments sanctioned by the Badminton World Federation (BWF) since 2007.

Women's singles

  BWF Grand Prix Gold tournament
  BWF Grand Prix tournament

Performance timeline

Singles performance timeline

To avoid confusion and double counting, information in this table is updated only once a tournament or the player's participation in the tournament has concluded. This table is current through 2016 All England Super Series Premier.

Record against selected opponents 
Record against year-end Finals finalists, World Championships semi-finalists, and Olympic quarter-finalists.

References

External links 

 
  Profile

Living people
1988 births
Badminton players from Shanghai
Chinese female badminton players
Badminton players at the 2012 Summer Olympics
Badminton players at the 2016 Summer Olympics
Olympic badminton players of China
Olympic silver medalists for China
Olympic medalists in badminton
Medalists at the 2012 Summer Olympics
Badminton players at the 2014 Asian Games
Asian Games gold medalists for China
Asian Games medalists in badminton
Medalists at the 2014 Asian Games
Universiade gold medalists for China
Universiade silver medalists for China
Universiade medalists in badminton
World No. 1 badminton players
BWF Best Female Player of the Year
Medalists at the 2007 Summer Universiade